Ignition is a transition and mentorship program that is implemented in high schools across the United States.  The program was developed and trademarked by Focus Training, a leadership development company in Milwaukee, Wisconsin. The goal of Ignition is to build student relationships and make the transition from middle school to high school a positive experience for students, administrators, and teachers.  The program utilizes upperclassmen to act as mentors to incoming freshmen for the entire 9th grade school year.  Mentors help freshmen acclimate to the high school environment, deal with the challenges of the new school, and learn successful behaviors.  As of 2010 the Ignition program is implemented at over 220 schools nationwide and serves over 100,000 students and educators.

References

External links 

Youth organizations based in the United States
Mentorships